In Poloniae annalibus (July 16, 1953) is a letter of Pope Pius XII  commemorating the seven hundredth anniversary of the canonization of Saint Stanislaw and encouraging the Polish episcopate to be united and strong in the face of persecution.

Content 
According to the letter, Saint Stanislaw was an example of steadfastness in his time and is a model for our time. As bishop of Krakow, he was a model for piety, social engagement and courage. He dared to tell King Boleslaw his faults and sin in his face. He was tortured as a result but his mind did not bend. The Krakow faithful were enraged over this sacrilege that they forced the king to abdicate. He went into exile for the rest of his life.

The bishops of Poland display the same fervour and the same love as the faithful in those days. Indeed, their trials are very comparable to those of Saint Stanislaw. A night of terror has descended over faithful Poland. But in the darkness of night shine the stars of Polish loyalty in such a way, that the whole world watches in admiration. Many Poles lost everything, because they defended their faith. Many lost their lives. Many bishops, priests and Religious were incarcerated, sent to Siberia, robbed of all rights, tortured, maligned and falsely accused of all things, for one reason only: They were messengers of Christ.  Average and dispirited persons cannot understand this, but eternal honour is certain all those, who gave everything. They are the true successors of Saint Stanislaw. His virtues continue to flourish among the Polish people. It may take time, but the powerful blessings of all these sacrifices will later bear rich fruit.

Pope Pius XII reviews Polish history in order to show how Polish loyalty and faith, following the example of Stanislaw, was always victorious. Saint Stanislaw this is not only a saint of virtue but of justice as well. And the Poles, who were divided at the time unified around the relics of the great saint. He admonishes the episcopate to maintain the same unity.

References

Sources 
In Poloniae annalibus, Acta Apostolicae Sedis, AAS, 1953, 498

Holy See–Poland relations
History of Catholicism in Poland
Persecution of Catholics during the pontificate of Pope Pius XII
Pope Pius XII apostolic writings
Catholic theology and doctrine
1953 documents
1953 in Christianity